Mount Litera School International is an international school situated in Bandra, Mumbai. It is a co-educational day school, being managed and run by Zee Learn Ltd. The school is affiliated with the International Baccalaureate Organisation (IBO) and has the classes from playgroup through class XII.

History
Mount Litera School International was founded in 2014, with aim of providing a balance between the knowledge and learning from around the world. The school is being managed by Zee Learn Ltd, an education chain, that has over 80 schools across the country under the brand name Mount Litera Zee School, it also runs Kidzee which is Asia's largest preschool network with over 1350 preschools across the country.

In 2018, Mount Litera School International took an initiative to help the flood-affected victims of Kerala on Friday. The school organized the initiative along with the Goonj Foundation.

Campus
The school features spacious classrooms equipped with interactive whiteboards, laboratories for science, maths, two libraries, a media center, and an auditorium. It also provides indoor sports games such as table tennis, badminton, squash, and basketball.

Academics
The school is affiliated with the International Baccalaureate Organisation (IBO) and has been authorized to run the following education programme;

 Primary Years Programme
 Middle Years Programme

Awards
 The school has been honored with Times Education Icon Awards 2017 under Emerging Schools’ category
 Mount Litera School International has been ranked among the top 20 international day schools in India by the EducationWorld C-fore Survey 2017.

See also
 Dhirubhai Ambani International School
 Podar International School

References

External links
Official Website

Private schools in Mumbai
International schools in Mumbai
International Baccalaureate schools in India
Educational institutions established in 2014
2014 establishments in Maharashtra